<onlyinclude>

March 2023

See also

References

killings by law enforcement officers
 03